Peter Morin is a Tahltan Nation artist, author, curator and professor at the Ontario College of Art and Design. He was born on September 8, 1977 in Telegraph Creek, British Columbia, Canada and identifies as member of the Crow clan. He addresses the issues of decolonization as well as Indigenous identity and language in his practice.

Education 
Morin completed his Masters of Fine Art at the University of British Columbia Okanagan in 2010, and a Bachelor of Visual Arts at the Emily Carr University of Art and Design in 2001. He also completed the Summer Publishing Program at Simon Fraser University in 2005, attended the Gulf Island Film and Television School in 2002 and obtained a Diploma of Fine Arts from Kwantlen Polytechnic University in 1997.

Curation 
Morin curated several exhibitions including at the Museum of Anthropology, Bill Reid Gallery, Western Front, Burnaby Art Gallery, and at the Satellite Gallery.

Exhibitions 
Morin has exhibited his work internationally and has worked with numerous other artists in a variety of shows.

Solo 
 Ceremony Experiments 1 Though 8, Urban Shaman Gallery, 2013
 Circle, Urban Shaman Gallery, 2011
 Peter Morin's Museum, Satellite Gallery, 2010
 Circle, FINA Gallery, 2010
 Memory Talking Stick, Open Space Arts Society, 2010
 12 Making Objects, Open Space Arts Society, 2009
 This is How We Protect Stones, The Ministry of Casual Living, 2009
 Things That Are Left Behind For Ravens, ODD Gallery, 2007
 Stop, Drop, and Bingo, Urban Shaman Gallery, 2004
 These Are My Creations, Says Crow, You Can't Take Them Away, Grunt Gallery, 2001

Group 
 Witnesses: Art and Canada's Indian Residential Schools, Moris and Helen Belkin Art Gallery, 2013
 Drawuary: Not A Day Goes By, Gallery Gachet, 2013
 Talking Stick, Roundhouse Community Centre, 2012 
 Best Before, McMaster University, 2011
 Challenging Traditions, McMicheal Canadian Art Collection, 2009
 Reply All, Art Metropolle, 2009
 Crazy Making, Gallery Gachet, 2007
 Healing and Transformation, Ministry of Casual Living, 2007
 Re-Translation: Land and Language, A Space Gallery, 2007
 Protection Paint: The Stories on Stones, Gallery Gachet, 2006

Published works 
Morin has written and contributed to several books, articles, and art reviews. These include Carrying on "Irregardless": Humour in Contemporary Northwest Coast Art in 2012, My Story of Making and Sewing Hides in 2012, Peter Morin's Museum in 2011, Access All Areas : Conversations On Engaged Art in 2008, Lawrence Paul Yuxweluptun: Neo-Native Drawings and Other Works in 2010 and Wibhun in 2007. Some of his art reviews include A Crow About Town in 2005, and 2400 An Indian Odyssey Article in 2003.

Residency

Artist residencies 
 Algoma University, 2013
 Open Space Arts Society, 2010
 Roundhouse Community Centre, 2005

Curator residencies 
 Open Space Arts Society, 2012
 Camosun College, 2009
 Roundhouse Community Centre, 2003

Awards 
Morin received the Hnatyshyn Foundation Mid-Career Outstanding Achievement as an Artist Award in 2016, the Victoria 150 Award in 2012 and the Fulmer Award in First Nations Art Award in 2010. In 2014, he was longlisted for the Sobey Art Award.

References 

1977 births
Living people